Harima Sea is the eastern part of the Seto Inland Sea in Japan. Located on the south side of the southwestern part of Hyogo Prefecture (formerly Harima Province), it is bounded by Awaji Island to the east, Shodoshima to the west, and Shikoku in the south, with the Ieshima Islands in the northwest.

An important route crosses from the Kinki region to the Chugoku, Shikoku, and Kyushu regions.

There are many rocky reefs, which are good fishing grounds for sea bream. Sand lance are often caught, and Tsukudani (sand lance simmered in soy sauce and mirin) is a specialty of Banshu, but production has been declining due to the damage to sand lance habitat caused by the extraction of sea sand.

Rivers 

 Hyogo prefecture            
 Kakogawa, Ichikawa, Yumesakigawa, Ibogawa, Chikusagawa (collectively referred to as Harima Gokawa), Senba River, Noda River, Ōtsumo River (Himeji City), Mihara River (Minamiawaji)
 Kagawa Prefecture
 Minatogawa (Higashikagawa City)

Port towns 

 Sakoshi
 Iwashihama
 Iwami
 Murotsu
 Fukuura
 Hiketa
 Takasu (Takasago City)
 Hinase (Okayama Prefecture)
 Ushimado (Okayama Prefecture)

Industrial ports 

 Himeji Port (Shikama, Hirohata, Aboshi)
 Higashiharima Port

Islands 

 Awaji Island
 Ieshima Islands
 Ieshima
 Tanga Island
 Boze Island
 Nishijima
 Shodoshima

References

External links 
 播磨灘 - 環境省
 

Seas of Japan
Seto Inland Sea